Celeste De Blasis (1946–2001) was a successful American author of historical romance novels.

Biography
Celeste N. De Blasis was born on May 8, 1946, in Santa Monica, California. She grew up at the Kemper Campbell Ranch in Victorville, California in the high Mojave Desert. She attended Wellesley College, later transferred to Oregon State University, and in 1968 was graduated from Pomona College where her longing to be back home at the ranch had drawn her. She continued to live on the ranch until her death from complications associated with lupus erythematosus on April 13, 2001.

Celeste De Blasis was published in a number of poetry magazines, including Manifold (London), Kauri, and Sandcutters. In 1969 she was given the Southern Division National League of PEN Women Award for Letters for her poetry.

In 1975, De Blasis published her first novel, The Night Child. It was followed the next year by Suffer A Sea Change (1976). Her third book, The Proud Breed (1978) was about the pride of being a Californian. Of the novel, De Blasis observed, "This story is very dear to me, and the need to write it came from the demands of pride. I grew up in an educational system that taught me more about the eastern seaboard than I needed to know and almost nothing about California...and the paucity of that history grew to be more and more galling. In the writing of The Proud Breed I have discovered what an immensely rich, varied and intricate weaving has made the fabric of this state, and I am proud to be even so small a thread in the pattern." The book became a Doubleday Book Club selection. In 1981, De Blasis published The Tiger's Woman. The book became Doubleday Book Club and Literary Guild selections. De Blasis then embarked on her most ambitious and successful work, the Wild Swan trilogy. The first volume, Wild Swan was published in 1984, set in Collington, Maryland around the Belair Mansion and was quickly followed by Swan's Chance in 1985. The final volume of the trilogy, A Season of Swans was published in 1989.

Her final book did not follow her proven historical romance formula. It was a biographical work titled Graveyard Peaches, about her life at the Kemper Campbell Ranch in Victorville, California. After the publication of this work, Celeste De Blasis battled lupus erythematosus until her death in 2001. She was cremated and her ashes were spread along her favorite trail at the Kemper Campbell Ranch where she had walked nearly every day.

Bibliography
Date First Published, Title, Contents Notes (if any), Series Connection (if any), Book/s Number in Series (if any), Original Publisher
1975, The Night Child, none, Coward, McCann & Geoghegan
1976, Suffer A Sea Change, none, McCann & Geoghegan
1978, The Proud Breed, A Three Generational Saga of California, none, McCann & Geoghegan
1981, The Tiger's Woman, none, Delacorte Press
1984, Wild Swan, first in the Wild Swan Trilogy, Bantam Books
1985, Swan's Chance, Second in the Wild Swan Trilogy, Bantam Books
1989, A Season of Swans, Third in the Wild Swan Trilogy, Bantam Books
1991, Graveyard Peaches, A California Memoir, none, St. Martin's Press

20th-century American novelists
American historical novelists
American romantic fiction writers
1946 births
2001 deaths
People from Victorville, California
Wellesley College alumni
Oregon State University alumni
American women novelists
20th-century American women writers
Women historical novelists
Women romantic fiction writers
Novelists from California
Pomona College alumni